Schauenberg is a hill and ruined castle near Turbenthal, canton of Zurich, at  elevation. There were fortifications since the Iron Age, and since the early 13th century, there was a wooden structure, in the 1250s extended to a massive keep. The fortress was destroyed in 1344. From 1622, Zurich maintained a system of beacons as a warning system, and signals from Schauenberg could be seen at Schnabel (Albis), Pfannenstiel, Tämbrig (above Hermatswil), Uetliberg, Lägern, Zürichberg, Mörsburg, Kyburg, Stammheimerberg and even Hohenklingen.

Literature 
 Daniel Hartmann (hrsg.): Die Burg Schauenberg bei Hofstetten. Fotorotar, Zürich 2000, .

References

External links 

Castles in the canton of Zürich
Ruined castles in Switzerland